The  2009–10 Moldovan "A" Division season was the 19th since its establishment.  A total of 16 teams contested the league.

"A" Division Clubs
FC Academia UTM-2 (Chişinău)
CSCA Buiucani (Chişinău)
FC Cahul-2005
FC Costuleni
FC Dinamo-2 (Bender)
CF Gagauziya (Comrat)
CF Intersport-Aroma Cobusca Nouă (Cobusca Nouă)
RS Lilcora (Suruceni)
Locomotiv Bălţi (Bălţi)
Mipan (Chişinău)
FC Olimp (Ungheni)
FC Olimpia-2 Tiligul (Ternovca)
FC Podiș (Ineşti)
FC Sfîntul Gheorghe-2 (Suruceni)
FC Sheriff-2 Tiraspol (Tiraspol)
FC Zimbru-2 Chişinău (Chişinău)

Final league table

References

External links 
  Official Site

Moldovan Liga 1 seasons
2009–10 in Moldovan football
Moldova